Gianni Caldana (19 November 1912 – 6 September 1995) was an Italian athlete who competed mainly in the 110 metres hurdles.

Biography
Caldana competed for an Italy at the 1936 Summer Olympics held in Berlin, Germany in the 4 x 100 metre relay where he won the silver medal with his team mates Orazio Mariani, Elio Ragni and Tullio Gonnelli.

Olympic results

National titles
Gianni Caldana has won 5 times the individual national championship.
5 wins in the 110 metres hurdles (1935, 1936, 1937, 1938, 1940)

See also
 Men's long jump Italian record progression

References

External links
 

1912 births
1995 deaths
Sportspeople from Vicenza
Italian male sprinters
Italian male hurdlers
Italian male long jumpers
Olympic athletes of Italy
Olympic silver medalists for Italy
Athletes (track and field) at the 1936 Summer Olympics
Medalists at the 1936 Summer Olympics
Olympic silver medalists in athletics (track and field)